Spain at the UCI Road World Championships is an overview of the Spanish results at the UCI Road World Championships. The Spanish competitors are selected by coaches of the Royal Spanish Cycling Federation. Apart from cycling events at the four-yearly Summer Olympics, the only times that road cyclists appear in proper national selections (instead of in commercial cycling teams) of one or multiple athletes are the yearly UCI Road World Championships. Because of this, all Spanish national road cycling teams (either elite, amateur or younger teams) only compete as such during one day per year. The nation's first medal, a silver, was earned by Luciano Montero in the men's road race in 1935.

List of medalists
This a list of all Spanish medals (including elite, amateur, under-23 and junior races).
Since the 2012 UCI Road World Championships there is the men's and women's team time trial event for trade teams and these medals are included under the UCI registration country of the team. Note that in these events also foreign cyclists can belong to the "national" team.

Sources

Most successful Spanish competitors
The list don't include the men's amateur events

Medals by discipline
Updated after 2018 UCI Road World Championships

References

Nations at the UCI Road World Championships
Spain at cycling events